Amit Ray (born 12 August 1960) is an Indian author and "spiritual master". He is known for his teachings on meditation, yoga, peace and compassion. He is best known for his 114 chakra system, Om meditation, and integrated yoga and vipassana meditation techniques. He is author of several books on meditation and other spiritual topics. He was one of the pioneers in proposing compassionate artificial intelligence.

Early life and education 

Amit Ray was born on 12 August 1960. He earned a B.E. in engineering at Bengal Engineering College, Shibpur, then affiliated with the University of Calcutta. Ray completed his M.Tech and PhD in 1993 from Indian Institute of Technology Kharagpur.

Career

Teachings 
He teaches a 114 Chakra system, the importance of integrating yoga, mindfulness  and positive approach towards life. He emphasizes the value of family. He underlines the value of beautification of inner dialog and the inner world with love light and compassion to make life beautiful.

Compassionate AI 
He is one of the pioneers of compassionate artificial intelligence movement. He introduced the concept of Deep Compassion algorithms and frameworks to solve humanitarian needs such as compassionate care-giving, helping physically and mentally challenged people. Ray argues the importance of compassion, kindness and emotional intelligence in the age of automation, AI and social robots. He said "As more and more artificial intelligence is entering into the world, more and more emotional intelligence must enter into leadership." Ray has used the term "compassionate social robot", which he defined as an autonomous physical agent that interacts with humans in social context like a human, on all fronts of emotions, intelligence, compassion and creativity.

Peace and humanitarian work 
He believes greater collaboration among international organisations is essential. He said, collaboration is the essence of life as the wind, bees and flowers work together, to spread the pollen. Ray advocates planting more trees, to give our children and the future generation a cleaner and safe environment. He stated that we may not plant millions of trees, but we can take care of one single tree with love and care that will make us great. Ray is the founding president of IISCIM, which is dedicated to remove the sufferings of humanity through yoga, meditation, Ayurveda, pollution-free environment, scientific research, and social welfare.

Books 
 Om Chanting and Meditation
 OM Sutra: The Pathway to Enlightenment
 Yoga and Vipassana: An Integrated Lifestyle
  Awakening Inner Guru: The Path of Realizing the God Within
 World Peace: The Voice of a Mountain Bird
 Meditation: Insights and Inspirations
 Compassionate Artificial Intelligence: Frameworks and Algorithms
 The Science of 114 Chakras in Human Body

References

External links 

 
 

1960 births
English-language writers from India
Writers from West Bengal
Living people
Indian spiritual teachers
Spiritual teachers
Scientists from West Bengal
Scholars from West Bengal
Indian spiritual writers
Indian yoga teachers
University of Calcutta alumni
IIT Kharagpur alumni